Kuzhorskaya (Ḥadžəẋuḥabl) is a rural locality (a stanitsa) and the administrative center of Kuzhorskoye Rural Settlement of Maykopsky District, Russia. The population was 3578 as of 2018. There are 66 streets.

Geography 
The stanitsa is located 28 km northeast of Tulsky (the district's administrative centre) by road. Tryokhrechny is the nearest rural locality.

References 

Rural localities in Maykopsky District